Guipel (Gallo: Gipèu) is a commune in the Ille-et-Vilaine department in Brittany in northwestern France.

Population
Inhabitants of Guipel are called Guipellois in French.

References

External links

Official website 
Mayors of Ille-et-Vilaine Association  

Communes of Ille-et-Vilaine